is a sect of Shinto that originated from Ise Grand Shrine, the Ise faith. It was not techically a Sect Shinto group but had characteristos of one.

The missionary body of the Ise faith 
The Jingu-kyoin was reorganized under the umbrella of the Jingu Church based on the existing Ise-ko (Taiji-ko). The Jingu-kyoin was established as the center of the Jingu Church.In 1873 (the 6th year of Meiji), based on a donation of 2,000 ryo by Matsudaira Munehide, Guji of Ise Jingu, a preaching hall was established to serve as a model for shrines throughout Japan, and in August it was named Jiyoukan, which meant "Shrine within Meiji Jingu The church was meant to be a church, the notification was made in March, and the building opened on October 1. The local koshas called themselves patriotic koshas, etc., but in October of 1873 (1873) they were unified and became Kamikaze Koshas.

From July to December of 1873, the Jingu Church's pilgrimage was planned by Urata and preached by Honjo and other ministers, and attracted an audience of 9,000 or more people on most days, and several hundred to 2,000 on others.

After the dissolution of the Great Teaching Institute, in accordance with Urada's teaching policy, a branch office was established in Tokyo, and each diocese in Japan had one headquarters church and branch churches.

Independence as a denominational Shinto sect 
In 1882, the Ministry of Home Affairs issued the "Ministry of Home Affairs Announcement No. B No. 7 of January 24, 1882," abolishing the dual role of the priest who presided over rituals and the Kyodo Shoku who conducted proselytizing. Shortly after this, the Ise Grand Shrine and the Jingu-kyoin were separated, and the Jingu-kyoin became a branch of the Sect Shinto called the Shinto Jingu-ha. After Urata retired in 1877 (10th year of Meiji), who had worked on the teaching, became the first head minister. On October 5, the various schools of the Sect Shinto were independent under the name of the school, but were not branches each with the name of the denomination as not being 

In 1882 (Meiji 15), it was agreed that the production and distribution of the Jingu Taima would be entrusted to the Jingūkyō administration, but the following year it was changed so that the Jingu Office was responsible for production and the Jingūkyō administration was responsible for distribution.

Tokyo Daijingu 

In 1882 (Meiji 15), in Hibiya, Tokyo  the Jingūkyō administration, built the Tokyo Daijingu, then called Hibiya Daijingu.

After the Kanto Earthquake, the shrine was moved to Iidabashi in 1928 and renamed to Iidabashi Daijingu. Then after World War 2, the place changed its name to Tokyo Daijingu.

Development and reorganization to the Association of Shinto Shrines through the Jingu-hosai-kai 
On September 24, 1899, the organization was reorganized as the Jingu-hosai-kai Foundation, an organization of reverends, due to the narrowing of the scope of its activities with the establishment of national Shinto and criticism of leaving the distribution of Jingu Taima, a national project, to one religious sect  In accordance with the Shinto Directive,January 23 1946, National Association of Shinto Priests, the Office of Japanese Classics Research, and Jingukyo, took the lead to establish the Association of Shinto Shrines.

Present
There is currently a religious organization of the same name in Hyōgo Prefecture Tamba Sasayama City. It is not a direct successor to the prewar Jingu-kyo, but has the Ise Grand Shrine branch as its deities and the Association of Shinto Shrines and is headed by Harufumi Hioki, the chief priest of Ikuta Shrine, a Beppyo Shrine, and is not unrelated to Ise Grand Shrine or the Shinto Shrines Agency.

Officials 

   is the grand priest of Ise Jingu Shrine.

References

Bibliography 

 
 （文庫：1994年.ISBN 4886924603.）
 .
 
 
 

Organizations disestablished in 1946
Organizations established in 1872
Association of Shinto Shrines
Shinto
Ise Province
Ise Grand Shrine
Pages with unreviewed translations
13 Shinto Sects
Shinto denominations